Maxime Authom (born 29 March 1987) is a Belgian tennis player playing on the ATP Challenger Tour.

Career
On 2 April 2012, he reached his highest ATP singles ranking of 184, after reaching his first ATP Challenger final in Rimouski, Canada. He is coached by Pim Van Mele. He won 7 single titles and 3 double titles in Futures tournaments.

Challenger finals

Singles: 0 (0–1)

References

External links

1987 births
Living people
Belgian male tennis players
Flemish sportspeople
People from La Louvière
Sportspeople from Hainaut (province)
21st-century Belgian people